"Islands in the Stream" is a song written by the Bee Gees and recorded by American country music artists Kenny Rogers and Dolly Parton. Named after an Ernest Hemingway novel, it was released in August 1983 as the first single from Rogers's album Eyes That See in the Dark. The song was originally written for Diana Ross in an R&B style but later reworked for the duet by Rogers and Parton. The Bee Gees released a live version of the song in 1998 and a studio version in 2001.

The song reached number one on the Billboard Hot 100 chart in the United States, giving both Rogers and Parton their second pop number-one hit (after Rogers's "Lady" in 1980 and Parton's "9 to 5" in 1981). It also topped the Country and Adult Contemporary charts. It has been double certified Platinum and gold certified singles by the Recording Industry Association of America for 2 million and half a million digital sales in US. In 2005 the song topped CMT's poll of the best country duets of all time; Parton and Rogers reunited to perform the song on the CMT special.

Rogers and Parton went on to record a Christmas album together and had an additional hit with their 1985 duet "Real Love".

Due to licensing reasons, this song was not included on digital release of Eyes That See in the Dark from Capitol Records Nashville. Sony Music, the current owner of RCA Records, protected copyrights for this recording, and is digitally available only in various compilations from Sony Music, especially those of Dolly Parton.

Musical structure
The song is sung in moderate  time, with Rogers and Parton alternating lead vocals. Their version is in C major when Rogers sings lead, but changes to A-flat major when Parton takes over the lead.

Reception
Cash Box said that "the sound is simply gorgeous, as is the melody, as are the voices."

Commercial performance
The song knocked Bonnie Tyler's "Total Eclipse of the Heart" out of No. 1 on the Billboard Hot 100, also topping the Country and Adult Contemporary listings. In December of that year, it was certified platinum by the Recording Industry Association of America for selling over two million physical copies in the US. After becoming available for digital download, it had sold a further 834,000 digital copies in the US, .

In Australia, the song was number one for one week in December 1983 and became one of the highest selling singles of 1984.

The song reached a peak of No. 7 in the UK singles chart in 1983. , it had also sold 245,577 digital copies in the UK. , it had racked up 287,200 downloads and 4.83 million streams in the UK.

In popular media
In April 2008, South Bend, Indiana, radio station WZOW played the song continuously for several days on end, a stunt drawing attention to the station's format change from alternative rock to adult contemporary.

The song was also used as a karaoke song in two season 2 episodes of ABC's The Good Doctor, "Islands Part One" and "Tough Titmouse".

Charts

Weekly charts

Year-end charts

All-time charts

Certifications

Cover versions
 Danish blues-rock singer Peter Thorup and pop singer Anne Grete Rendtorff had great success with a version with Danish lyrics in 1984 called Skibe uden Sejl (Ships without Sails). The song was used as title track for the Danish TV series Måske i morgen (maybe tomorrow) shown on Danish national television DR.
 Jamaican reggae artist Owen Gray covered the song on an album entitled "Little Girl" in 1984. 
The chorus of the 1998 hip-hop song "Ghetto Supastar (That Is What You Are)" is an interpolation of the chorus of "Islands in the Stream". The song was made by Pras and Wyclef Jean along with vocals from Mya.
Country artists Hailey Whitters and ERNEST, under the moniker Countrypolitan, covered the song in 2021

Bee Gees' recorded version

The Bee Gees performed their version live at the MGM Grand in Las Vegas on 14 November 1997, which was released a year later on One Night Only, with solo vocal by Barry Gibb.  A studio version was recorded for their 2001 retrospective Their Greatest Hits: The Record, which has since featured on the 2004 Number Ones and on the 2010 Mythology box set. The chorus of Pras's 1998 hit "Ghetto Supastar (That Is What You Are)", which in turn is a reworking of the original Rogers and Parton release, replaces the final chorus in the studio recording. The live version of the song appears on their Love Songs compilation.

Personnel (studio version)
Robin Gibb – vocals
Maurice Gibb – keyboard, programming
 John Merchant – sound engineer

Personnel (live version)
Barry Gibb – lead vocals, acoustic rhythm guitar
Robin Gibb — harmony and backing vocals
Maurice Gibb – harmony and backing vocals, keyboard
with
Alan Kendall – lead guitar
Steve Gibb - guitar

Comic Relief version

On March 8, 2009, Welsh actors Ruth Jones and Rob Brydon, in character as Vanessa Jenkins and Bryn West from the hit BBC sitcom Gavin & Stacey, released a version of the song as a single for Comic Relief. Sir Tom Jones also features on the song, performing the final verse and chorus, whilst Robin Gibb appears on the single as a backing vocalist.

Re-titled "(Barry) Islands in the Stream", in reference to the Barry Island setting of Gavin & Stacey, it entered at the top of the UK Singles Chart on March 15, 2009. This meant the Gibb Brothers had achieved number one songs in five successive decades, the first songwriters to achieve this feat. It also made Tom Jones, at the age of 68, the oldest person to have a UK number one song, until the record was taken in 2020 by Captain Tom Moore for his involvement in "You'll Never Walk Alone" at the age of 99.

The video was filmed in Barry Island, Las Vegas and the Nevada desert, with both Gibb and Jones appearing in the video alongside Jones and Brydon. Nigel Lythgoe also makes a cameo appearance as a talent competition judge.

Track listing
 CD single
 "(Barry) Islands in the Stream" – 3:56
 "Wisemen" – 3:14
 "Somethin' Stupid" – 2:48
 "Islands in the Stream" (music video) – 4:21

 DVD single
 "(Barry) Islands in the Stream" (full-length video) – 8:56
 "(Barry) Islands in the Stream" (making of the video) – 14:30

Charts

Weekly charts

Year-end charts

See also
List of Billboard Hot 100 number-one singles of 1983

References
The Billboard Book of Number 1 Hits

1983 songs
1983 singles
2009 singles
Bee Gees songs
Barry Gibb songs
Dolly Parton songs
Kenny Rogers songs
Kikki Danielsson songs
Billboard Hot 100 number-one singles
Cashbox number-one singles
Number-one singles in Australia
Number-one singles in Austria
Number-one singles in Scotland
RPM Top Singles number-one singles
UK Singles Chart number-one singles
Songs written by Barry Gibb
Songs written by Maurice Gibb
Songs written by Robin Gibb
Song recordings produced by Albhy Galuten
RCA Records Nashville singles
Polydor Records singles
Comic Relief singles
Male–female vocal duets
Songs about islands